The Men's 100 metre butterfly competition of the 2022 European Aquatics Championships was held on 13 and 14 August 2022.

Records
Prior to the competition, the existing world, European and championship records were as follows.

Results

Heats
The heats were started on 13 August at 09:15.

Swim-off
The swim-off was held on 13 August at 10:16.

Semifinals
The semifinals were started on 13 August at 18:34.

Final
The final was held on 14 August at 18:00.

References

Men's 100 metre butterfly